Burkea may refer to:
 Burkea (plant), a genus of flowering plants in the family Fabaceae
 Burkea (fungus), a fungus genus in the division Microsporidia